Rajya Sabha elections were held in 1984, to elect members of the Rajya Sabha, Indian Parliament's upper chamber.

Elections
Elections were held in 1984 to elect members from various states.
The list is incomplete.

Members elected
The following members are elected in the elections held in 1984. They are members for the term 1984-90 and retire in year 1990, except in case of the resignation or death before the term.

State - Member - Party

Bye-elections
The following bye elections were held in the year 1984.

State - Member - Party

 Bihar  -  Anand Prasad Sharma - INC ( ele 22/08/1984 term till 1988 )
 West Bengal - Shantimoy Ghosh - CPM ( ele 22/08/1984 term till 1987 ) dea 31/10/1986

References

1984 elections in India
1984